In chemistry, a NONOate is a compound having the chemical formula R1R2N−(NO−)−N=O, where R1 and R2 are alkyl groups. One example for this is 1,1-diethyl-2-hydroxy-2-nitrosohydrazine, or diethylamine dinitric oxide. These compounds are unusual in having three sequential nitrogen atoms: an amine functional group, a bridging NO− group, and a terminal nitrosyl group. In contact with water, these compounds release NO (nitric oxide).

pH-dependent decomposition of NONOates
Most NONOates are stable in alkaline solution above pH 8.0 (e. g. 10 mM NaOH) and can be stored at −20 °C in this way for the short term. To generate NO from NONOates, the pH is lowered accordingly. Typically, a dilution of the stock NONOate solution is made in a phosphate buffer (pH 7.4; tris buffers can also be used) and incubated at room temperature for the desired time to allow NO to accumulate in solution. This is often visible as bubbles at high NONOate concentrations. Incubation time is important, since the different NONOates have different half-lives (t½) in phosphate buffer at pH 7.4. For example, the half-life of MAHMA NONOate under these conditions is ~3.5 minutes, whilst the t½ of DPTA NONOate is 300 minutes. This is often useful in biological systems, where a combination of different NONOates can be used to give a sustained release of nitric oxide. At pH 5.0, most NONOates are considered to decompose almost instantaneously.

References

Nitrosyl compounds